"The Next Right Thing" is a song from the 2019 animated Disney film Frozen II. It is performed by American actress and singer Kristen Bell in her vocal role as Princess Anna  and the music and lyrics are written by Kristen Anderson-Lopez and Robert Lopez. The song is about Anna's descent into depression. The song has received praise from critics for its message and meaning and peaked on the Kid Digital Songs chart at number 7.

Synopsis
At the darkest moment of the film, Anna is faced with uncertainty about what to do next after apparently losing both her beloved sister Elsa as well as Olaf, a snowman created by Elsa's magic. She sings "The Next Right Thing" and expresses her depression. Later in the song, she concludes when not knowing what to do, one must do "The Next Right Thing".

Production
Bell told director Jennifer Lee she wanted to see Anna "face her codependency head-on" and "a song about what she's going to do when she doesn't know what to do". Anderson-Lopez and Lopez drew inspiration from personal tragedy in the lives of two people that worked on Frozen and Frozen II; co-director Chris Buck lost a son, and Andrew Page, a central figure in the music production of both films, lost a daughter. Buck's son died around the time when Buck needed to begin the interviews and press tours to promote Frozen; the Lopezes witnessed how Buck insisted on going through that highly public process and the subsequent awards season even though he was dealing with such a terrible personal tragedy at the same time. Anderson-Lopez stated when writing the lyrics, she "really just thought about them, and wrote it for them." Bell said she drew inspiration from her own mental health.

International versions

As it happened in Moana with a Tahitian, Māori and Hawaiian version, the Sami version was an exceptional dubbing made specifically for the movie, given the inspiration it took from Sami culture.

Reception
Multiple critics have praised "The Next Right Thing" for its meaning and message. MEAWW argues the song provides "one of the movie's most inspiring messages about dealing with pressure". The Los Angeles Times deemed it the best song of Frozen II. Hypable stated that the song was the "most valuable thing Frozen 2 has to offer". Jonathan Groff, who voices Kristoff in the film, said hearing the song "brought [him] to tears".

Charts

References 

2019 songs
Kristen Bell songs
Songs about depression
Songs written by Kristen Anderson-Lopez
Songs written by Robert Lopez
Songs from Frozen (franchise)
Disney songs
Songs written for animated films
Songs written for films